Master Man is the name of three fictional characters that appear in comic books published by Marvel Comics.

Publication history

The original Master Man (Wilhelm Lohmer) first appears in the title Giant-Size The Invaders #1 (June 1975) and was created by Roy Thomas and Frank Robbins.

The second version (Axl Nacht), first appears in Namor the Sub-Mariner #11 (Feb. 1991) and was created by John Byrne.

The third version (Max Lohmer) debuts in Captain America #18 (July 2006) and was created by Ed Brubaker and Steve Epting.

Fictional character biography

Wilhelm Lohmer
Wilhelm "Willie" Lohmer first appears in the title Giant-Size Invaders. Portrayed as a physically frail American Bundist and Nazi sympathiser, Lohmer agrees to participate in an experiment in which he is subjected to the Nazi version of the Super-Soldier Serum. Endowed with physical abilities exceeding those of Captain America, the character is given a costume and the alias Master Man, with Lohmer to be the first of a new Aryan "master race". As Master Man, Lohmer battles the Allied superheroes The Invaders, but is defeated when his new abilities prove to be temporary.

The character reappears in a two part story in the title Marvel Two-In-One, and with Nazi allies Brain Drain, U-Man and Skyshark plans to sabotage New York City with a new super weapon. The plan, however, is foiled by time travelling Fantastic Four member the Thing and the Liberty Legion.

A revitalised Master Man, now possessing even greater abilities, reappears in the title The Invaders and ambushes the superteam while they are flying over Europe. During the course of a multi-issue storyline involving the Invaders' incarceration and eventual escape from a prison in the German city of Berlin, Master Man meets Julia Koenig, who courtesy of an accident gains abilities similar to his own and becomes the Nazi heroine Warrior Woman. At the insistence of Adolf Hitler, leader of the Third Reich, the two are to be married, his logic being that they are the progenitors of a new race. The ceremony, however, is interrupted when the priest is killed by rubble from a building damaged during a battle between the Invaders and German troops. Master Man and Warrior Woman retreat when confronted by the Human Torch, who becomes enraged when his ward Toro is wounded by gunfire.

Master Man continues to be a perennial foe for the Invaders, battling the team while disguised as the hero the Destroyer and as part of a team formed by the Japanese spy Lady Lotus, the Super-Axis.

In a flashback, Master Man assisted Warrior Woman and Armless Tiger Man into partaking in an all-out invasion of Wakanda where they fought against Captain America, T'Chaka, and Sgt. Fury and his Howling Commandos.

Lohmer reappears in the title Cable, now an old man living in Switzerland and wishing to make amends for his past actions. The character dies when shielding Cable from a bullet fired by a member of the organization the Hellfire Club.

Axl Nacht
It is revealed in flashback in the title Namor the Sub-Mariner that near the end of World War II, Baron Strucker placed Master Man and Warrior Woman in suspended animation in a hidden laboratory, thereby "preserving" the Nazi dream for use at a later time. Master Man is revived by scientist Axl Nacht, and at Nacht's direction, the character abducts the original Human Torch and Ann Raymond (Toro's widow) - their blood being necessary to help revive Warrior Woman, who had suffered brain damage. Nacht betrays Master Man when it is revealed that his father first cared for the two superbeings while in suspended animation, and unknowingly instilled in the younger Nacht an obsession with Warrior Woman. When Namor the Sub-Mariner, former founding member of the Invaders, finds the laboratory, he battles Master Man, until the Nazi loses his abilities and reverts to Wilhelm Lohmer. Nacht steals Master Man's abilities for himself, and has apparently also won the affections of the revived but unstable Warrior Woman. Namor rescues the prisoners as Lohmer destroys the laboratory, although no bodies are found in the wreckage.

Max Lohmer
The grandnephew of Lohmer, Max Lohmer, appears in the fifth volume of Captain America. Lohmer leads a gang of Neo-Nazis called the Master Men, who are empowered with a weaker version of the Super-Soldier Serum by Red Skull. The gang embark on a rampage in London until they are defeated by Captain America and heroes Union Jack and Spitfire.

Powers and abilities
Wilhelm Lohmer was a frail human until exposed to the Nazi variation of Professor Erskine's Super-Soldier Serum, and receives enhanced physical abilities. The Nazi version of the process is amplified and as a result Lohmer receives greater abilities than those of Captain America, including superior strength, stamina, durability, speed, and flight. The serum, however, was unstable and at times Lohmer would revert to his normal self.

Other versions

Heroes Reborn
In the Heroes Reborn universe, a version of Master Man named Alexander appears as a super-powered ally to the Red Skull promoting Nazism in the present day, and is seen attacking Nick Fury (and is revealed as an LMD). This version of Master Man later develops the delusion that he is the Christian God and forms a cult in which his gamma-powered minions enslave the population of California.

References

External links
 Master Man (Wilhelm Lohmer) at Marvel.com
 Master Man (Wilhelm Lohmer) at Marvel Wiki
 Master Man (Axl Nacht) at Marvel Wiki
 Master Man (Max Lohmer) at Marvel Wiki
 Master Man at Comic Vine

Characters created by Ed Brubaker
Characters created by Frank Robbins
Characters created by John Byrne (comics)
Characters created by Roy Thomas
Comics characters introduced in 1975
Comics characters introduced in 2006
Marvel Comics Nazis
Marvel Comics neo-Nazis
Marvel Comics supervillains